Mari-Liis Lillemäe (born 1 September 2000) is an Estonian footballer who plays as a midfielder for the University of Texas Rio Grande Valley in first division of the National Collegiate Athletic Association (NCAA) and the Estonia women's national team.

Career
Lillemäe has been capped for the Estonia national team, appearing for the team during the UEFA Women's Euro 2021 qualifying cycle.

International goals

References

External links
 
 
 
 

2000 births
Living people
People from Viljandi Parish
Estonian women's footballers
Estonia women's international footballers
Women's association football midfielders
FC Flora (women) players
UT Rio Grande Valley Vaqueros women's soccer players